"Tell Me What You Want Me to Do" is a song by American singer Tevin Campbell. It was written by Campbell, Sally Jo Dakota, and Narada Michael Walden and produced by the latter for his debut studio album T.E.V.I.N. (1991). Released as the album's third single, it became Campbell's biggest hit to date, peaking at number 6 on the US Billboard Hot 100 and spending one week at number-one on the US R&B chart. "Tell Me What You Want Me to Do" showcases Campbell's four-octave vocal range from a low note of E2 to a D#6 during the bridge of the song.

Track listings

Notes
 denotes additional producer

Charts

Weekly charts

Year-end charts

See also
List of number-one R&B singles of 1992 (U.S.)

References

Tevin Campbell songs
1991 singles
1991 songs
Songs written by Tevin Campbell
Songs written by Narada Michael Walden
Song recordings produced by Narada Michael Walden
Warner Records singles
Contemporary R&B ballads
Pop ballads
Soul ballads
1990s ballads